Kemptown is a rural community in the Canadian province of Nova Scotia, located in Colchester County. The area which became Kemptown was included within the Philadelphia grant of 1765.

References

Kemptown on Destination Nova Scotia

Communities in Colchester County